A plasma cannon (also called an electrothermal accelerator) is an experimental projectile weapon, which accelerates a projectile by means of a plasma discharge between electrodes at the rear of the barrel, generating a rapid increase in pressure. It functions similarly to other types of firearms, except that it uses a plasma discharge instead of a chemical propellant (e.g. black powder or nitrocellulose).

Design

To generate the energy required to make a plasma discharge,  a high current, high voltage source, and a large capacitor bank are used. Both are attached in series to the electrode system in the cannon's barrel. The capacitor is loaded with as high a voltage as possible. However, militarily useful energy is achieved with as little as several kilojoules. The capacitor is then discharged. The  gap between the electrodes ionizes, turning the non-flammable propellant medium  into a super heated conductive plasma. Associated volumetric expansion propels the projectile from the barrel at high velocity.

Advantages and disadvantages
The advantage of a plasma cannon is that it uses electricity as its energy source. The more energy that is supplied the faster the gases expand and the faster the projectile can be accelerated. This makes it possible to "dial-in" any velocity desired and allows the projectile to reach a speed at which it would be possible to "outrun" the burn rate of a conventional propellant.

A clear disadvantage of the plasma cannon is its weight. Even a small plasma cannon with only the firepower of an air gun weighs about 20 kg (without current supply). A foot soldier thus could not carry a plasma cannon powerful enough to be useful. It would have to be mounted in a stationary position or on a vehicle. It would be impossible for a soldier to carry a plasma cannon with the firepower of an actual cannon.

See also
 Electrothermal-chemical technology
 Plasma railgun

Further reading
Günter Wahl: Blitz und Donner selbst erzeugt (in German)

Artillery
Plasma physics